Mannequin is a 1933 British drama film directed by George A. Cooper and starring Harold French, Judy Kelly and Diana Beaumont. It was made at Twickenham Studios in London with sets designed by the art director James A. Carter. Produced as a quota quickie, it was released by the American distributor RKO.

Synopsis
A boxer leaves his true love for another woman but ultimately returns to her.

Cast
 Harold French as Peter Tattersall
 Judy Kelly as Heather Trent
 Diana Beaumont as Lady Diana Savage
 Whitmore Humphreys as Billy Armstrong (as Whitmore Humphries)
 Richard Cooper as Lord Bunny Carstairs
 Ben Welden as Chris Dempson
 Faith Bennett as Queenie
 Vera Bogetti as Nancy
 Anna Lee as Babette
 William Pardue as Armstrong's trainer
 Carol Lees as Binkie
 Toni Edgar-Bruce as Mrs. Mannering

References

Bibliography
 Chibnall, Steve. Quota Quickies: The Birth of the British 'B' Film. British Film Institute, 2007.
 Low, Rachael. Filmmaking in 1930s Britain. George Allen & Unwin, 1985.
 Wood, Linda. British Films, 1927-1939. British Film Institute, 1986.

External links
 Mannequin at IMDb
 
 Mannequin at The British Film Institute

1933 films
British drama films
1933 drama films
British black-and-white films
1930s British films
1930s English-language films
Films shot at Twickenham Film Studios
Films directed by George A. Cooper
RKO Pictures films
Quota quickies